Brachystola magna, one of the grasshoppers known as plains lubber or western lubber, is a large grasshopper native to southern and central USA and Northern Mexico.

It is reddish brown with black dots on its outer wings, however there is some variation in colouration, with more northern races being greener, and southern ones more buff. The Brachystola magna has extremely small wings and is unable to fly. The antennae are bluish-brown and the legs are reddish near the body with purple tarsi. It has a ridge along the upper and middle region of the abdomen. It is distinguished from Brachystola virescens by its longer antennae and colour.

In Wyoming it is found on gravelly ground in the southwest of the state. It does not cause significant damage to crops, and seems to prefer coarse broadleaved plants to crops. It overwinters in the egg, which hatch in the spring and reach adulthood in August.

Walter Sutton's description of reduction division was based on studying the spermatocytes of Brachystola magna. This work was critical in the development of the chromosome theory of inheritance.

References

Romaleidae